The Leidy Award is a medal and prize presented by the Academy of Natural Sciences of Drexel University (formerly the Academy of Natural Sciences of Philadelphia), Philadelphia, Pennsylvania, USA. It was named after US palaeontologist Joseph Leidy. The award was established in 1923 to recognize excellence in "publications, explorations, discoveries or research in the natural sciences", and was intended to be presented every three years. The award consists of a rectangular bronze medal (decorated with a bust depiction of Leidy) and an honorarium which was initially $5000.

Laureates
1925 – Herbert Spencer Jennings
1928 – Henry Augustus Pilsbry
1931 – William Morton Wheeler
1934 – Gerrit Smith Miller Jr.
1937 – Edwin Linton
1940 – Merritt Lyndon Fernald
1943 – Chancey Juday
1946 – Ernst Mayr
1949 – Warren Poppino Spencer
1952 – G. Evelyn Hutchinson
1955 – Herbert Friedmann
1958 – Herbert Barker Hungerford
1961 – Robert Evans Snodgrass
1964 – Carl Leavitt Hubbs
1967 – Donn Eric Rosen
1970 – Arthur Cronquist
1975 – James Bond
1979 – Edward Osborne Wilson
1983 – G. Ledyard Stebbins
1985 – Hampton Carson
1989 – Daniel H. Janzen
1994 – Peter and Rosemary Grant
2006 – David B. Wake
2009 – Dan Otte
2010 – Tim Flannery
2012 – Douglas Futuyma

See also 

 List of general science and technology awards 
 List of biology awards
 List of earth sciences awards
 List of paleontology awards

References

American science and technology awards
Biology awards
Earth sciences awards
Paleontology awards
Drexel University